Norman Edgar Marshall (27 February 1924 – 11 August 2007) was a West Indian international cricketer. He was born in the Welchman Hall Plantation, Saint Thomas, Barbados and played in a Test match against Australia in 1955. His brother Roy also played Test cricket for the West Indies and scored over 30,000 first class runs, mostly for Hampshire.

Marshall was an all-rounder who bowled off-spin and played in the middle order as an attacking right-handed batsman. He played most of his first class cricket for Barbados but appeared for Trinidad four times while he was working there in 1954 and 1955. His top score was 134 for Barbados against British Guiana in 1951–52, and his best bowling figures were 6 for 117 against Jamaica in 1946–47.
 
He played for the Wanderers Club in Barbados, and spent some time working and playing cricket in Peru and Venezuela after his first-class cricket career ended.

External links

1924 births
2007 deaths
West Indies Test cricketers
Barbadian cricketers
Barbados cricketers
Trinidad and Tobago cricketers
North Trinidad cricketers
People from Saint Thomas, Barbados